Stirling West is one of the seven wards used to elect members of the Stirling Council. It elects three Councillors.

Councillors

Election Results

2017 Election
2017 Stirling Council election

2012 Election
2012 Stirling Council election

2007 Election
2007 Stirling Council election

References

Wards of Stirling
Stirling (city)